Grigorios Lambovitiadis (1908-1945) was a Greek patriot, representative of the Greek community in southern Albania and an activist of the Northern Epirus movement. He was executed by the authorities of the People's Republic of Albania as "enemy of the state".

Life
Lambovitiadis was born to a Greek family in the village of Dhuvjan, Ottoman Empire, today in southern Albania. After finishing ground-level studies at his home village he moved to Corfu, Greece. Later, he attended the dentist school of the University of Athens, where he graduated in 1935.

In 1940, during World War II, Lambovitiadis organized Greek resistance groups in his home region Gjirokaster and in nearby Delvinë. After the withdrawal of the Axis forces, the region came under the control of the People's Republic of Albania. Lambovitiadis campaigned against post-war incorporation of Northern Epirus to Albania and protested against machinations of the agents of the Albanian communist party. He later attempted to organize elections in order to declare a one-party state in Albania. As a result, Lambovitiadis, together with other Greek activists, were considered "enemy of the state" and arrested. After being tortured in jail a show trial followed which summarily sentenced him to death.

Family
Lambovitiadis' wife died in prison shortly after. Their son Georgios Lambovitiadis was jailed and exiled by the local regime. After the restoration of democracy in Albania (1991) he was involved in local politics, in particular, defending minority and human rights of the local Greek community. As such, he became the chairman of the Omonoia organization in 1996-1999.

References

See also
Vasileios Sachinis

1908 births
1945 deaths
Albania in World War II
Epirus in World War II
Greek Resistance members
Greek torture victims
Northern Epirus independence activists
People from Dropull
People murdered in Albania
20th-century executions by Albania
Albanian emigrants to Greece